Coenogonium atherospermatis is a species of lichen in the family Coenogoniaceae. Found in Tasmania, it was formally described as a new species in 2018 by lichenologists Gintaras Kantvilas, Eimy Rivas Plata, and Robert Lücking. The species epithet refers to the genus of the preferred host tree. Within Tasmanian rainforest vegetation, Atherosperma is known for harbouring "a distinctive suite of lichens", including C. atherospermatis.

Description

The  cells are more or less spherical, broadly ellipsoid to oblong, and occur in clumps or short chains. The margin is cream, smooth, and glossy. The hymenium is 45–55 μm thick and contains asci and paraphyses. The ascospores are irregularly , measuring 6.0–8.5 by 2.5–3 μm.  were not found in this lichen.

References

Gyalectales
Lichen species
Lichens described in 2018
Lichens of Australia
Taxa named by Gintaras Kantvilas
Taxa named by Robert Lücking